Chun Chik-yu; June 12, 1859 – October 18, 1936) was a Chinese-Hawaiian businessman who served briefly as Governor of Guangdong Province from 1922 to 1923. He was born Toney Afong, full name Antone  Abram Kekapala Keawemauhili Afong.

Early life 
He was born on June 12, 1859, the eldest son and second child of Chun Afong and Julia Fayerweather Afong. Considered the first Chinese millionaire in Hawaii, his father was a wealthy Honolulu merchant originally from Zhuhai, Guangdong. His mother was a British-Hawaiian woman of aliʻi (noble) descent. He had fifteen siblings and at least three half-siblings from his father's first wife Lee Hong in China.

Afong took Toney to China in June 1862. He left his Hawaiian son to live with his Chinese wife and family in Meixi and took his eldest Chinese son Alung back to Hawaii to raise in each other's respective culture for the next seven years. Toney returned with Afong and his half-brother in 1869. Back in Honolulu, Alung was enrolled at Punahou School (called Oahu College) and Toney at ʻIolani School (called St. Alban's College). Both brothers were prepared for college at Hartford Public High School in Connecticut. Alung later enrolled in Yale University under the tutelage of Yung Wing.
Toney was also said to have enrolled in either Trinity College, Yale or Harvard University, although there are no known records of his attendance in either of these institutions.

Career 
Unlike his Hawaiian siblings, Toney later left Hawaii and settled in China with his father. He became a successful businessman in Hong Kong and Macau with another half-brother Chun Kang-yu. They invested heavily in real estate, shipping, railroads, merchandising, and agriculture. He was influential in the Chinese General Chamber of Commerce in Hong Kong and instrumental in the founding of the University of Hong Kong.

The brothers were early supporters of Sun Yat-sen, the founder of the Republic of China who had also been a student at Punahou School in Honolulu. They later allied themselves with Guangdong warlord Chen Jiongming who advocated for a federalist model of government based on the United States against Sun's centralized approach based on the Russia. With the backing of Chen, Toney was elected as governor of Guangdong from 1922 to 1923 before being ousted by supporters of Sun. His son Chun Wing-Sen, who became a general under Chen, was shot and killed in the streets of Hong Kong in 1924, possibly a political assassination. Toney retired to Macau and spent the rest of his life collecting Chinese antiques.

Personal life 
He married Julien Chang and had three children: Chun Wing-Sen, Irene Chun Wing-Luen, Chun Wing-Keu. He also had six concubines but did not have children with them. Irene married T. Y. Lau, the son of Lew Yuk Lin, the last Qing Dynasty ambassador to the Court of St James's. His son Chun Wing-Sen (1827–1924) was a member of the Yale College class of 1912 and became a general under Chen Jiongming before his death.

Notes

References

Bibliography 

1859 births
1936 deaths
Hawaii people of Chinese descent
People from Honolulu
People from Zhuhai
Businesspeople from Guangdong
Hong Kong businesspeople
Macau businesspeople
ʻIolani School alumni
Governors of Guangdong
Trinity College (Connecticut) alumni